The Melbourne Reds were a short-lived minor league baseball team based in Melbourne, Florida. That season the team won the league title before folding with the league at the end of the season.

References
Baseball Reference 1972 Melbourne Reds

Baseball teams established in 1972
Defunct minor league baseball teams
Defunct baseball teams in Florida
Baseball teams disestablished in 1972